The Utva C-3 Trojka (Trey) was a light aircraft built in Yugoslavia shortly after World War II as a result of a government competition to develop a new, domestically built aircraft with which to equip the country's flying clubs. The winning design was submitted by Boris Cijan and Djordje T. Petković and the prototype was built by Ikarus as the Ikarus 251. Series production took place at Utva as the C-3. It was a conventional, low-wing cantilever monoplane with fixed tailwheel undercarriage. The pilot and instructor sat side by side under an expansive canopy. The type remained in production until the mid-1950s with later examples powered by the more powerful Walter Mikron 4.

Operators

Yugoslav Air Force
Letalski center Maribor

Specifications

See also

References

 
 
 
 

1940s Yugoslav civil trainer aircraft
Ikarus aircraft
Trokja
Single-engined tractor aircraft
Low-wing aircraft
Aircraft first flown in 1946